The Horites ( Ḥōrīm), were a people mentioned in the Torah inhabiting areas around Mount Seir in Canaan.

Name
According to Archibald Sayce (1915), the Horites have been identified with references in Egyptian inscriptions to Khar (formerly translated as Harri), which concern a southern region of Canaan. More recent scholarship has associated them with the Hurrians.

The rabbinical tradition, dating back to Genesis Rabbah 42:6 (300-500 CE), explains the name of Horites as meaning "the free people", from the Semitic root Ḥ-R-R meaning "free". This explanation is less plausible if Horites are identified with Hurrians, who are not a Semitic people.

Hebrew Bible (Old Testament in the Christian Bible) 
The Horites initially appear in the Torah as being members of a Canaanite coalition, who lived near the Sodom and Gomorrah. The coalition rebelled against Kedorlamer of Elam, who ruled them for twelve years. Kedorlamer attacked and subdued them in response.

They were eventually brought under the rule of the descendants of Esau, also then known as Edom.

The ancestry of Seir the Horite is not specified. Some say Seir lived around the time of Terah, father of Abraham. He is also said to be a descendant of Hor who is supposed to have lived around the time of Reu and was a descendant of Hivi, son of Canaan son of Ham. They are also linked to the Rephaim even though they are not explicitly called Rephaim in the Biblical text. 

The pre-Edomite Horite chiefs, descendants of Seir, are listed in the Book of Genesis and 1 Chronicles. Two of these chiefs would appear to have been female - Timna and Oholibamah. Timna is infamous for being the progenitor of the Amalekites, the archenemy of the Israelites. 

At some time, certain of these leaders rose to the level of 'kings' over the other chiefs, and the Horite land became known as Edom rather than the land of Seir. One example of these kings is Jobab, son of Zerah, a son of Esau and his wife Basemath, who was Ishmael's daughter. Another is a 'Temanite', Husham, a descendant of Esau's son, Teman. 

None of these kings' sons became kings after their fathers died. Apparently, there was no familial royal line whereby sons of these post-Horite kings succeeded to the throne, but rather, some other system was in place by which kings were either chosen or won the right to rule.

By the time governance of these peoples had been consolidated under kings instead of chiefs, Horites are no longer mentioned as such.

References

Edom
Hebrew Bible nations
Ancient peoples of the Near East
Arab groups
History of Saudi Arabia
History of Palestine (region)
Ancient history of Jordan
Ancient Israel and Judah
Book of Genesis
Book of Deuteronomy